John McLean (April 20, 1793 - December 5, 1858) was an American lawyer and politician from New York.

Life
He was the son of State Senator John McLean (1760–1834) and Mary (Van Kirk) McLean (1762–1835). He married Maria Blanchard (1796–1827), a daughter of Assemblyman and First Judge Anthony I. Blanchard.

McLean graduated A.M. from Union College in 1815. Then he studied law, and was admitted to the bar in 1818.

McLean was a member of the New York State Assembly (Warren and Washington Co.) in 1818.

He was a member of the New York State Senate (4th D.) from 1829 to 1832, sitting in the 52nd, 53rd, 54th, and 55th New York State Legislatures.

He was First Judge of the Washington County Court from 1835 to 1847. He was again a member of the State Senate in 1837. He was a Regent of the University of the State of New York from 1835 until his death.

He died of pneumonia and was buried at the Evergreen Cemetery in Salem, NY.

Congressman Henry H. Ross was married to Susannah Blanchard, a sister of McLean's wife.

Sources
The New York Civil List compiled by Franklin Benjamin Hough (pages 128f, 131, 143, 194, 290 and 365; Weed, Parsons and Co., 1858)
Obituary in The Historical Magazine (Vol. III, 1859; pg. 28)
A General Catalogue of the Officers, Graduates and Students of Union College (Schenectady NY, 1854; pg. 23)

External links

1793 births
1858 deaths
People from Washington County, New York
Members of the New York State Assembly
New York (state) state senators
Deaths from pneumonia in New York (state)
Union College (New York) alumni
New York (state) state court judges
19th-century American politicians
19th-century American judges